"Hollywood" is a rock song by Irish band The Cranberries. It is the fourth single from the band's third album, entitled To the Faithful Departed. Plans to record a video clip were abandoned after the band cancelled the remaining of their Free to Decide World Tour and other promotional activities due to lead singer Dolores O'Riordan's health problems. The worldwide release of a commercial CD single was cancelled as well, except in France.

Track listings
2-track CD single (France)
 "Hollywood" – 5:06
 "Forever Yellow Skies" (Live in Toronto, 29 August 1996) – 3:28

4-track CD single (France)
 "Hollywood" – 5:06
 "Forever Yellow Skies" (Live in Toronto, 29 August 1996) – 3:28
 "Dreams" (Live in Toronto, 29 August 1996) – 4:20
 "Waltzing Back" (Live in Toronto, 29 August 1996) – 4:59

Cover
In 2020, it was covered by doom metal band Thou and indie rock singer Emma Ruth Rundle for their collaborative EP The Helm of Sorrow.

References

1997 singles
The Cranberries songs
Songs written by Dolores O'Riordan
Song recordings produced by Bruce Fairbairn
1995 songs